The Mistress and Her Servant (German: Die Herrin und ihr Knecht) is a 1929 German silent film directed by Richard Oswald and starring Henny Porten, Mary Kid and Fritz Kampers. It was based on the novel of the same title by Georg Engel. The film's art direction was by Franz Schroedter.

Cast
 Henny Porten as Johanna von Grothe 
 Mary Kid as Marianne, Johannas Schwester 
 Fritz Kampers as Oberst Sassin 
 Igo Sym as Fürst Fergussow 
 Alexander Wiruboff as Erster Adjutant 
 Alexander Sascha as Zweiter Adjutant 
 Bruno Ziener as Baumgartner 
 Renée Stobrawa as Frau Matjunke 
 Gustl Gstettenbaur as Hans

References

Bibliography
 Belach, Helga. Henny Porten.: Der erste deutsche Filmstar. 1890 - 1960.. Haude & Spener, 1986.
 Weniger, Kay. 'Es wird im Leben dir mehr genommen als gegeben ...' Lexikon der aus Deutschland und Österreich emigrierten Filmschaffenden 1933 bis 1945. ACABUS Verlag, 2011.

External links

1929 films
Films of the Weimar Republic
German silent feature films
Films directed by Richard Oswald
Films based on German novels
German black-and-white films